Mseke is an administrative ward in the Iringa Rural district of the Iringa Region of Tanzania. In 2016 the Tanzania National Bureau of Statistics report there were 12,985 people in the ward, from 15,868 in 2012.

Villages / vitongoji 
The ward has 4 villages and 24 vitongoji.

 Tanangozi
 Kanisani
 Kihongolelo
 Kilindi
 Kimwanyula
 Lunguya
 Stesheni 'A'
 Stesheni 'B'
 Mlandege
 Gezaulole
 Maumbamatali
 Mlandege 'A'
 Mlandege 'B'
 Ugwachanya
 Banavanu
 Igavilo
 Ismila
 Lukolela
 Mseke 'A'
 Mseke 'B'
 Njiapanda 'A'
 Njiapanda 'B'
 Ulongambi
 Winome
 Wenda
 Wenda 'A;
 Wenda 'B'
 Wenda 'C'
 Wenda 'D'

References 

Wards of Iringa Region